Francesco Benaglio (c. 1432 - 1492) was an Italian painter of the Renaissance period.

His original name was Francesco di Pietro della Biada.  'Della Biada' (or 'a Blado') means 'of the oats' and was a reference to the profession of his father Pietro who was a grain merchant from Bergamo.  Francesco moved with his family to Verona, where he is documented from 1456 until his death.  He adopted his artist name Francesco Benaglio from a noble family then living in Bergamo.

The artist was active in Verona.   His first known work is a triptych in the church of San Bernardino in Verona (1462-1463).  This was a prestigious commission and suggests he was already quite famous by that time.  In 1475, Benaglio and another painter by the name of Martino were jailed for four months for painting one night some obscene or defamatory frescoes on the facade of the Sagramorso family palace, apparently at the behest of enemies of the family.

A group of five Madonnas ascribed to the artist show an ostentatious use of perspective foreshortening together with an almost geometric rigidity in the drawing of the figures. The monumentality of the figures is further emphasized by the highly stylized landscapes in the background.

References

External links

15th-century Italian painters
Italian male painters
Painters from Verona
Renaissance painters
Fresco painters
Year of birth uncertain
1432 births
1492 deaths